Bash-Shidy (Baş-Şiźe) is a rural locality (a selo) and the administrative centre of Bashshidinsky Selsoviet, Nurimanovsky District, Bashkortostan, Russia. The population was 228 as of 2010. There are 4 streets.

Geography 
Bash-Shidy is located 8 km southeast of Krasnaya Gorka (the district's administrative centre) by road. Malye Shidy is the nearest rural locality.

References 

Rural localities in Nurimanovsky District